Michael Sabbath is an American lawyer, currently the Southeastern Bankruptcy Law Institute-Homer Drake, Jr. Endowed Chair in Bankruptcy Law at Walter F. George School of Law, Mercer University.

References

Living people
Mercer University faculty
American lawyers
Year of birth missing (living people)